Usman Ishak (born 3 July 1994) is a Sri Lankan cricketer. He made his first-class debut for Colombo Cricket Club in the 2016–17 Premier League Tournament on 28 January 2017. He made his List A debut on 24 March 2021, for Colombo Cricket Club in the 2020–21 Major Clubs Limited Over Tournament.

References

External links
 

1994 births
Living people
Sri Lankan cricketers
Colombo Cricket Club cricketers
Cricketers from Colombo